Franklin Hansen (May 2, 1897 – January 13, 1982) was an American sound engineer. He won an Academy Award in the category of Sound Recording for 1932's A Farewell to Arms and was nominated for four more in the same category.

Selected filmography
Hansen won an Academy Award and was nominated for four more in the category Best Sound:
Won
 A Farewell to Arms (1932)

Nominated
 The Love Parade (1930)
 Cleopatra (1934)
 The Lives of a Bengal Lancer (1935)
 The Texas Rangers (1936)

References

External links

1897 births
1982 deaths
American audio engineers
Best Sound Mixing Academy Award winners
20th-century American engineers